Black River is an  river in the U.S. state of Michigan, flowing into the St. Clair River in the city of Port Huron. The Black River Canal in northern Port Huron extends east into Lake Huron near Krafft Road.

The river rises in northern Sanilac County, near the boundary with Huron County, and its  drainage basin covers most of the central and southern portions of Sanilac County, most of northern St. Clair County, and portions of east central Lapeer County. Large sections of the upper portion of the river and much of its drainage basin are heavily channelized for agricultural irrigation. Black River was the original name of the city of Croswell at the time of its founding in 1845.

Tributaries

Main stream from the mouth to Mill Creek 

 (left) Stocks Creek
 (right) Price Drain
 (left) Baldwin Drain
 (right) Black River Canal
 Howe Drain
 (left) Warner Drain
 (right) Brandymore Drain

Mill Creek 
 (left) Mill Creek
 (left) Gleason Drain
 (left) White Drain
 (left) Sheehy Drain
 (right) Thody Drain
 (left) Thompson Drain
 (right) Sanilac and Saint Clair Drain
 (right) Cole Drain
 (right) Ohmer Drain
 (left) Middleton Drain
 (left) Meharg Drain

North Branch Mill Creek 
 (right) North Branch Mill Creek
 (right) Wait Drain
 (right) Root Drain
 (right) Kenney Drain
 (left) Flansburg Drain
 (left) East Goodland Drain
 (right) Willoughby Drain
 (left) Evans and McKillen Drain
 (left) Willoughby Branch
 (right) Scott Drain
 (left) Toman Drain
 (right) Clarkson Drain
 (left) Courter Drain
 (right) Madison Drain
 (left) Stevenson Drain
 (right) West Branch Stevenson Drain
 (left) Crowe Drain
 (right) Wilkie Drain
 (left) Anchor Drain

Elk Lake Creek 
 (left) Elk Lake Creek
 (right) Brant Lake Drain
 (right) Pickerel Lake
 Devall Drain
 (right) Simmons Lake
 (left) Cranberry Lake
 Mitchell Lakes
 (right) Winn Drain
 Stanton Lakes
 Rose Lake
 (right) Mud Lake Drain
 Mud Lake
 (left) Lombar Drain
 (right) Cadillac Drain
 (right) Swamp Corners Drain
 (right) Barber Drain
 (left) Elgin Drain
 Elk Lake

South Branch Mill Creek 
 South Branch Mill Creek
 (right) Frasier Drain
 (right) Black Segate Reid Drain
 (left) Lynn Mussey Drain
 (left) Kaufman Drain
 (left) Kolb Drain
 (right) Galley Drain
 (left) Weitzig Drain
 (left) Mudcat Drain
 (left) Wendt Drain
 Petz Lake
 Hughes Drain
 Sans Lake
 Baines Lake
 Jurn Drain
 (left) Bunde Drain
 (right) Brandy Run

Main stream from Mill Creek to Black Creek 
 (left) Glyshaw Drain
 (left) O'Dette Drain
 (left) Plum Creek
 (right) Engles Drain
 (left) Pohly Drain
 (left) Silver Creek
 (right) Wilson Drain
 (left) Fueslein Drain
 (right) Eves Drain
 (left) Jackson Drain
 (right) Hayes Drain
 (left) Mason Drain

Black Creek 
 (left) Black Creek (also known as Seymour Creek)
 (right) William Doan Drain
 (left) Allen Drain
 (right) Seymour Creek (also spelled Seymore Creek)
 (right) Lawson Drain
 (left) Crouce Drain
 (right) Perry Drain (also known as Seymour Creek)
 (left) Bradley Creek
 (left) Willey Drain
 (left) Jackson Creek
 (left) Robertson Drain
 (right) Livergood Drain
 (left) Teets Drain
 (right) McIntyre and Willing Drain
 (left) Lavell Drain

Main stream from Black Creek to Elk Creek 
 (left) Mills Creek
 (left) Arnot Creek
 (left) McClelland Drain
 (right) Smith Drain
 (left) Taylor Drain
 (right) Freeman Drain
 (left) Wagner Drain
 (left) Papst Drain
 (right) Murray Drain
 (right) Kelly Creek
 (left) Kelly Drain

Elk Creek 
 (left) Elk Creek (also known as Elk River)
 (right) Recor Drain
 (right) Meyers Drain
 (right) Alexander Drain
 McPherson Drain
 (right) Methven Drain
 (left)Potts Drain (also known as Potts Creek)
 (right) Rickett Drain
 (right) Miller Drain
 (left) Roskey Drain
 (left) Harlan Drain
 (left) Baum Drain
 (right) Rickett Drain
 (left) French Drain
 (right) Spring Creek Drain
 (left) Cork Drain
 (right) Putney Drain
 (right) Engle Drain
 (left) Topping Drain
 (right) Thomas Drain
 (left) Hunt Drain
 (right) Cline Drain
 (right) Watertown State Drain
 (right) Lynch Drain
 (left) Parks Drain
 (left) Mullen Drain
 (right) Smalldon Drain
 (right) Colebough Drain
 (right) Beals Frizzle Drain
 (left) Hale Drain
 (right) Johnson Barrett Drain
 (right) Eggert Drain
 (left) Cummer Drain
 (right) Severance Drain
 (right) McElhinney Drain
 (right) Barr Drain
 (right) McDonald Drain
 (right) Phillips Drain
 (right) Eagle Drain
 (left) Setter Drain
 (right) Welch Drain
 (left) Powers Drain
 (left) East Branch Speaker and Maple Valley Drain
 (left) Fletcher Drain
 (left) McGauley Drain
 (right) Bowers Drain
 (left) Bowers Drain
 (right) Shell Drain
 (right) Macklem Drain
 (left) Mullaney Drain
 (left) Beemer Drain
 (right) Weston Drain
 (right) Elk Flynn and Maple Valley Drain
 (left) Jones Drain
 (left) Omard Drain
 (left) Smafield Drain
 (right) Lapeer and Sanilac Drain
 (left) Hydorn Drain
 (left) Valley Center Drain
 (right) Varney Drain
 (left) York Drain
 (right) Scott Drain

Main stream above Elk Creek 
 (right) Carsonville Drain
 (left) McPherson Drain
 (right) McDonald Drain
 (right) Shrapnell Drain
 (left) Berry Drain
 (right) Fye Drain
 (left) Baerwolf Drain
 (right) Kinney Drain
 (right) Graves Drain
 (left) Custer County Drain
 (right) Dwight Drain
 (left) Dunlap Drain
 (left) Stone Drain
 (left) Howse Drain
 (left) Badgero Drain
 (right) Bradshaw Drain
 Dunlap Drain
 (left) Black Drain
 (left) Wilkins Drain
 (left) O'Connell Drain
 (left) Nicol Drain
 (right) Anderson Drain
 (left) Freel Drain
 (right) Pyette Drain
 Deckerville Reservoir
 (left) Smith Drain
 (right) Flannigan Drain
 (right) Pelton Drain
 (right) Grandy Drain
 (left) Thompson Drain
 (right) Bishop Drain
 (left) McManus Drain
 (right) Terpinning Drain
 (left) Carrol Drain
 Monroe Drain
 Richie Drain
 Hewitt Drain
 (left) Hewitt Carroll Drain
 (right) Darlington Drain
 (right) Doggan Drain
 (right) Lloyd Drain

Drainage basin

Lapeer County 
 Arcadia Township
 Attica Township
 Burnside Township
 Goodland Township
 Imlay Township

St. Clair County 
 Brockway Township
 Clyde Township
 Emmett Township
 Fort Gratiot Township
 Grant Township
 Greenwood Township
 Kenockee Township
 Kimball Township 
 Lynn Township
 Mussey Township
 Port Huron
 Port Huron Township
 Yale

Sanilac County 
 Applegate
 Argyle Township
 Bridgehampton Township
 Brown City
 Buel Township
 Carsonville
 Croswell
 Custer Township
 Deckerville
 Delaware Township
 Elk Township
 Elmer Township
 Flynn Township
 Fremont Township
 Lexington Township
 Maple Valley Township
 Marion Township
 Melvin
 Minden Township
 Moore Township
 Peck
 Sandusky
 Sanilac Township
 Speaker Township
 Washington Township
 Watertown Township
 Wheatland Township
 Worth Township

References 

Rivers of Michigan
St. Clair River
Rivers of Lapeer County, Michigan
Rivers of Sanilac County, Michigan
Rivers of St. Clair County, Michigan
Port Huron, Michigan